The Fadul are an influential tribe in the Arabian Peninsula and Iraq.

References

Arab groups
Tribes of Iraq
Tribes of Kuwait